Seniors Services and Long-Term Care is a division of the City of Toronto. It is the lead division in integrating services for seniors across the municipal government, and it operates the 10 City-owned long-term care homes in Toronto. It assumed responsibility for publicly-run home care facilities for the elderly from the former Toronto Community Services department.

Funding
As a division of the City of Toronto, its annual funding level is established by a vote of Toronto City Council. In 2020, Council approved a budget of $271.191 million gross and $47.953 million net, with a staff complement of 2,435.2 positions.

Facilities
 Cummer Lodge
 Bendale
 Kipling
 Carefree Lodge
 True Davidson Acres
 Bendale 
 Seven Oaks
 Fudger House 
 Castleview Wychwood Towers
 Westburn Manor

References

External links
 Official website

Municipal government of Toronto
City of Toronto departments